Auguste Francisque Sirot (29 September 1919 – 7 April 1994) was a French gymnast. He competed in eight events at the 1948 Summer Olympics.

References

1919 births
1994 deaths
French male artistic gymnasts
Olympic gymnasts of France
Gymnasts at the 1948 Summer Olympics
20th-century French people